Tojikobod District or Tajikabad District ) is a district in Tajikistan, one of the Districts of Republican Subordination. It is surrounded by Sangvor District from the south, Lakhsh District from the north-east, and Rasht District from the north-west. Its capital is the village Tojikobod. The population of the district is 46,000 (January 2020 estimate).

Administrative divisions
They are as follows:

References

Districts of Tajikistan